Joséphine Le Tutour (born November 20, 1994) is a French model.

Early life
Joséphine Le Tutour won the French edition of Elite Model Look and represented her country for the international contest where she placed seventh. She has a baccalauréat ES. Not long after graduating, she was sent to Australia in order to learn how to pose and walk the runway.

Her brother Jules is also a model signed to Elite Model Management. They walked for Sonia Rykiel together in 2015.

Career
Throughout her career, she advertised Alberta Ferretti, Bottega Veneta, Carolina Herrera, Chloé, Derek Lam, Diane von Fürstenberg, Dior, Donna Karan, Etro, Giorgio Armani, Gucci, Hugo Boss, Iceberg, Jil Sander, Joe Fresh, Michael Kors, Mugler, Ports 1961, Tiffany & Co., Vera Wang, VINCE., Y-3 and Zara.

She walked more than 300 fashion shows including Alexander McQueen, Anthony Vaccarello, Calvin Klein, Cédric Charlier, Céline, Chanel, Elie Saab, Fendi, Giambattista Valli, Gianfranco Ferré, John Galliano, Marni, Missoni, Nina Ricci, Saint Laurent, Sonia Rykiel, Stella McCartney, Valentino, Vanessa Bruno,

References

Further reading

External links

 
 

French female models
People from Morbihan
Living people
Place of birth missing (living people)
1994 births
Elite Model Management models